White County Courthouse may refer to:

Old White County Courthouse, Cleveland, Georgia
White County Courthouse (Arkansas), Searcy, Arkansas

See also
White Pine County Courthouse